Clypeus may refer to:
 Clypeus (echinoderm), a fossil genus of echinoid 
 Clypeus Grit, a stratum in the Jurassic Inferior Oolite named for the echinoid
 Clypeus (arthropod anatomy), a sclerite in an insect's exoskeleton
 Clypeus (fungal), an anatomical component in some fungi